Nishiganj  is a gram panchayat and not identified as a separate place in 2011 census in the Mathabhanga II CD block in the Mathabhanga subdivision of the Cooch Behar district  in the state of West Bengal, India.

Geography

Location

Nishiganj I and Nishiganj II are gram panchayats.

Area overview
The map alongside shows the western part of the district. In Mekhliganj subdivision 9.91% of the population lives in the urban areas and 90.09% lives in the rural areas. In Mathabhanga subdivision 3.67% of the population, the lowest in the district, lives in the urban areas and 96.35% lives in the rural areas. The entire district forms the flat alluvial flood plains of mighty rivers.

Note: The map alongside presents some of the notable locations in the subdivisions. All places marked in the map are linked in the larger full screen map.

Education
Madhusudan Hore Mahavidyalaya was established in 2011 at Nishiganj. Affiliated with the  Cooch Behar Panchanan Barma University, it offers honours courses in Bengali, English, Sanskrit,  history, geography and philosophy, and a general course in arts.

Healthcare
There is a  primary health centre at Nishiganj (with 10 beds).

References

Villages in Cooch Behar district